Big Creek Township, Arkansas may refer to:

 Big Creek Township, Craighead County, Arkansas
 Big Creek Township, Fulton County, Arkansas
 Big Creek Township, Hot Spring County, Arkansas
 Big Creek Township, Lee County, Arkansas
 Big Creek Township, Newton County, Arkansas
 Big Creek Township, Phillips County, Arkansas
 Big Creek Township, Sebastian County, Arkansas
 Big Creek Township, Sharp County, Arkansas
 Big Creek Township, White County, Arkansas

See also 
 List of townships in Arkansas
 Big Creek Township (disambiguation)

Arkansas township disambiguation pages